Leonardo "Léo" Pereira (born 31 January 1996) is a Brazilian footballer who plays as a central defender for Campeonato Brasileiro Série A club Flamengo.

Club career

Atlético Paranaense
Born in Curitiba, Paraná, Léo Pereira finished his formation with Atlético Paranaense. He made his Série A debut on 3 May 2014, replacing Marcos Guilherme in a 2–3 home loss against Cruzeiro. He went on to make a further thirteen league appearances in 2014.

Guaratinguetá (loan)
Pereira joined Guaratinguetá of Série C on loan in August 2015 where he made eight appearances before returning to Atlético in October 2015.

Orlando City (loan)
On March 14, 2017 Pereira joined Orlando City B, the USL affiliate of Orlando City, on a season long loan. He was the first player to move between the two clubs since they became official partners the previous November. After beginning the season with Orlando City B, he was called up to the first team in mid-April and made his MLS debut against San Jose Earthquakes on 17 May 2017.

Flamengo
On 28 January 2020 Flamengo signed Pereira from Athletico Paranaense in a €6.1m transfer.

On 27 January 2023 Pereira extended his contract with Flamengo until 31 December 2027.

International career
Pereira has made twelve appearances across two age levels for the Brazilian national team. He received his first call up to the U17s when he was selected for the 2013 South American Under-17 Football Championship in April. He made two appearances in Argentina against Peru and Venezuela. His final U17 caps came in October and November when he was called up for the 2013 FIFA U-17 World Cup in the United Arab Emirates. The first coming in the Group Stage against Honduras and the second in a quarter-final penalty shoot-out defeat to Mexico in which Pereira scored a spot-kick in the shoot-out.

Two years later Pereira appeared in five of Brazil's 2015 South American Youth Football Championship matches, with two caps coming against Colombia and the other three coming against Uruguay, Paraguay and Peru who he also scored against. Later that year he played in three of Brazil's 2015 FIFA U-20 World Cup matches. The first two came in the Group Stage against Hungary and North Korea, he scored a goal against the latter, and his last U20 World Cup cap was versus Senegal in a 5–0 semi-final win. Brazil subsequently made it to the final which they lost to Serbia, Pereira was an unused substitute.

Career statistics
.

Honours
Athletico Paranaense
Copa Sudamericana: 2018
J.League Cup / Copa Sudamericana Championship: 2019
Copa do Brasil: 2019
Campeonato Paranaense: 2018

Flamengo
Copa Libertadores: 2022
Recopa Sudamericana: 2020
Campeonato Brasileiro Série A: 2020
Copa do Brasil: 2022
Supercopa do Brasil: 2020, 2021
Campeonato Carioca: 2020, 2021

References

External links
Atlético Paranaense official profile 
Furacão.com profile 

1996 births
Living people
Footballers from Curitiba
Brazilian footballers
Association football defenders
Campeonato Brasileiro Série A players
Campeonato Brasileiro Série B players
Campeonato Brasileiro Série C players
Club Athletico Paranaense players
Guaratinguetá Futebol players
Clube Náutico Capibaribe players
Major League Soccer players
USL Championship players
Orlando City B players
Orlando City SC players
Copa Libertadores-winning players
Brazil youth international footballers
Brazil under-20 international footballers
Brazilian expatriate footballers
Brazilian expatriate sportspeople in the United States
Expatriate soccer players in the United States